The Muppet Show: Sex and Violence was the second of two pilots for The Muppet Show, airing on ABC on March 19, 1975. The other pilot, The Muppets Valentine Show, aired in 1974.

Plot
In this half-hour variety special, the Muppets parody the proliferation of sex and violence on television. Nigel, Sam the Eagle, and hippie bassist Floyd Pepper prepare for a Pageant based on the Seven Deadly Sins, with Muppets representing the Sins—Envy, Anger, Gluttony, Vanity, Lust, Greed, and Sloth.

Sketches include these:
 Mount Rushmore: The stone presidents trade jokes.
 At the Dance
 The Wrestling Match: The San Francisco Earthquake displays his winning tactics.
 Statler and Waldorf sit in their den.
 The Swedish Chef demonstrates how to make a submarine sandwich.
 For The Birds: Male birds try to attract females in a jazzy skit.
 The Electric Mayhem sing "Love Ya to Death".
 Theater of Things: The pencils get a new ruler.
 Aggression: Featuring two Heaps, tarantula-like monsters talking in gibberish.
 Films in Focus: A review pans the film Return to Beneath the Planet of the Pigs.
 This sketch would become the basis for the comedy sketch series "Pigs in Space."
 The Seven Deadly Sins Pageant

Cast
This special introduces several new Muppets, including Nigel (who acts as host, but would eventually play a minor role as an orchestra conductor on The Muppet Show), Sam Eagle, Dr. Teeth, Janice, Floyd Pepper, Zoot, Animal, Swedish Chef, Statler and Waldorf, and an early version of Dr. Julius Strangepork (named "Dr. Nauga"). Popular Jim Henson characters, like Kermit the Frog, Rowlf the Dog, and Frank Oz's Bert have cameos. As well as, a few holdovers from the previous pilot, The Muppets Valentine Show, such as Crazy Donald (now called "Crazy Harry"), George the Janitor, Mildred Huxtetter, and Brewster. It has early versions of Miss Piggy and Gonzo the Great.

 Jim Henson as Nigel, Mount Rushmore (George Washington Head), Swedish Chef, Dr. Teeth, Waldorf, Kermit the Frog, Shirley (puppetry), Green Heap, Ernie Woman, Hudson, and Rowlf the Dog
 Frank Oz as Animal, Sam the Eagle, Mount Rushmore (Theodore Roosevelt Head), The San Francisco Earthquake's Opponent, Clyde, Ruler, Purple Heap, Bert, Pig, and George the Janitor
 Jerry Nelson as The Announcer, Floyd Pepper, Mount Rushmore (Thomas Jefferson Head), Thudge, Thudge's Dancing Partner, Statler, Harvey, Envy, Pencil, Gold Stalk, Gluttony, Gene Shalit Muppet, Dr. Nauga, and Sloth
 Richard Hunt as Crazy Harry, Mel, Hoggie Marsh, and Lust
 Dave Goelz as The San Francisco Earthquake, Avarice, Zoot, Duke, and Brewster
 John Lovelady as Mount Rushmore (Abraham Lincoln Head), Vanity, and Anger
 Fran Brill as Receptionist Voice, Janice, Doris, Pink Stalk, Leafy Green Vegetables, Miss Piggy, Queen Pig, and Whatnot Dancer
 Rollie Krewson as Shirley (voice)

Additional Muppet performers: Caroly Wilcox and Jane Henson

Home media
The Muppet Show: Sex and Violence was released on DVD in 2005, as an extra feature on the Muppet Show: Season One box set. On the box and on the DVD menus, it is referred to as The Muppet Show Pilot.

References

External links
 The Muppet Show: Sex and Violence at Muppet Wiki

1975 in American television
The Muppets television specials
American television series premieres
Films scored by Joe Raposo
Films with screenplays by Marshall Brickman
Seven deadly sins in popular culture
1975 television specials